Smolník (German: Schmöllnitz, Hungarian: Szomolnok) is a village and municipality in the Gelnica District in the Košice Region of eastern Slovakia.

Etymology
The village got its name after the stream Smolník.  –  pitch, smolník –  a settlement of people who collected pitch or lived in a forest where the pitch was collected. It belonged to a German language island. The German population was expelled in 1945.

References

External links
 Official page of Smolník 
 http://en.e-obce.sk/obec/smolnik/smolnik.html

Villages and municipalities in Gelnica District